The case of Irianna V.L. involves the arrest, trial, conviction, and subsequent reactions surrounding PhD student Irianna V.L.'s alleged involvement in the terrorist organization "Conspiracy of Fire Nuclei". Irianna V.L. was eventually found innocent after appealing her conviction. The case gained significant attention due to Irianna being found guilty based on an insufficient DNA sample. Additionally, the court's consideration of Irianna's social connections and activities, such as a trip to Barcelona, a city known for its anarchist presence, sparked controversy. Irianna's initial 13-year sentence was met with skepticism, as it appeared to undermine the principle of presumption of innocence.

Timeline 

It was 2011 when Greek police was surveilling the house of a group of notorious anarchists, then suspects for links with "Conspiracy of Fire Nuclei". Irianna visited the specific place some times as those anarchists were friends of her boyfriend. After a police raid, Irianna gave a testimony to Greek police and voluntarily a DNA sample. In November 2011, arms were found in Polytechnic School of Athens, by accident, a small sample of DNA was spotted on them, below the threshold for reaching safe conclusion. In 2013, Irianna was arrested solely based on the tiny DNA sample found on the arms the police found in 2011. The issue was that the sample was so small that it was less than it was required by the law - so little that the sample was consumed for the first examination of the DNA and there was no left for cross-examination to validate the results.

The first degree trial that followed, found Irianna guilty and sentenced her to 13 years in prison, based on the DNA sampling.

In 2018, she was found not guilty by a second decree trial and was freed.

Concerns raised about the DNA sample in Irianna's case 

The DNA sample collected from the guns were 174pg when the required mass of DNA is legally defined as 200pg. 
The two samples (from the guns and Irianna's) matched in 7 from total 16 sequences identified. 
The European Ombudsman in 2008 (decision 2008/C 89/01) reported that because of false positive results in DNA matching, every sample should be cross examined at least once.

Criticism of the trial 

The acceptance by the court of the DNA evidence has been widely criticized. Professor of the philosophy of Law at University of Athens, Aristides Hatzis, highlighted various police shortcomings regarding the DNA sampling, from collecting the sample to its interpretation, that should have led to the rejection of the DNA matching and hence Irianna should have been found not guilty. Hatzis also claimed that Irianna was punished by the police and the court for having an affair and social relations with anarchists- which constitutes a fundamental violation of the rule of law.

Likewise, Gregoris Kalfetzis, professor of Law at AUTH raised his concern on the handling and interpretation of the DNA sample and noticed parallels between Irianna's case and the notorious Dreyfus affair- where the judiciary decision was predetermined before the trial and the evidence was manipulated to fit the decision.

See also
Anarchism in Greece
DNA profiling

References

Anarchism in Greece
Trials in Greece
2013 in Greece
Wrongful convictions